Rodrigo Melo Franco de Andrade (1898–1969) was a Brazilian art critic and historian.  He served as director of preservation of artistic heritage of Brazil at the Ministry of Education. He is credited, among many similar discoveries, with reviving interest in Antônio Francisco Lisboa. He is the author of Monumentos Históricos y Arqueológicos de Brasil (Mexico, 1952).

References

1898 births
1969 deaths
Brazilian art critics
Brazilian art historians